Zusidava serratilinea is a moth in the family Drepanidae first described by Wileman and South in 1917. It is found in Taiwan.

The wingspan is 23–27 mm. Adults are on wing in June, July and October.

The larvae feed on the leaves of Prunus phaeosticta phaeosticta. Mature larvae fix the terminal end of a leaf with silk at the mid-rib to pupate inside.

References

Moths described in 1917
Drepaninae